Mohamed Reda Abaci (born August 8, 1975) is a former Algerian international footballer who had 8 caps and 1 goal for the Algeria national football team.

International career
Abaci had 8 caps and 1 goal for the Algeria national football team.

International Goals

Honours
JS Kabylie
 CAF Cup (2): 2000, 2001

References

External links
 

1975 births
Algeria international footballers
Algerian footballers
AS Khroub players
CS Constantine players
ES Sétif players
GC Mascara players
JS Kabylie players
JSM Béjaïa players
USM Annaba players
People from Annaba Province
Living people
Association football midfielders
21st-century Algerian people